The Energy and Climate Change Select Committee was a select committee of the House of Commons in the Parliament of the United Kingdom that came into existence on 1 January 2009.

Formation
The House of Commons agreed to the committee's establishment on October 28, 2008, following the establishment of the Department of Energy and Climate Change on 3 October 2008. The remit of the committee is to examine the expenditure, administration and policy of the department, and any departmental bodies.

Membership
The membership of the committee, appointed in July 2015, was as follows:

Source: Energy and Climate Change Committee

Changes
Occasionally, the House of Commons orders changes to be made in terms of membership of select committees, as proposed by the Committee of Selection. Such changes are shown below.

References

External links
 Committee website
 Records for this Committee are held at the Parliamentary Archives

Department of Energy and Climate Change
Defunct Select Committees of the British House of Commons